Mozambique frog may refer to:

 Mozambique rain frog (Breviceps mossambicus), a frog in the family Brevicipitidae found in Africa
 Mozambique ridged frog (Ptychadena mossambica) a frog in the family Ptychadenidae found in Africa

Animal common name disambiguation pages